Duke Leopold may be
Leopold IV, Duke of Bavaria  (d. 1141)
Leopold, Duke of Austria
Leopold V, Duke of Austria (d. 1194)
Leopold VI, Duke of Austria (d. 1230)
Leopold I, Duke of Austria of Habsburg (d. 1326)
Leopold III, Duke of Austria (d. 1386)
Leopold IV, Duke of Austria (d. 1411)
Archduke Leopold Wilhelm of Austria (d. 1662)
Leopold V, Archduke of Austria (d. 1632)
Leopold I, Grand Duke of Tuscany (=Leopold II, Holy Roman Emperor)
Leopold, Duke of Lorraine (d. 1729)
Leopold, Duke of Lorraine (d. 1817)
Leopold, Grand Duke of Baden (d. 1852)
Leopold, Duke of Lorraine (d. 1869)
Leopold II, Grand Duke of Tuscany (d. 1870)
Leopold IV, Duke of Anhalt (d. 1871)
Prince Leopold, Duke of Albany (d. 1884)

See also
Leopold of Habsburg (disambiguation)
Leopold of Austria (disambiguation)
Leopold I (disambiguation)
Leopold II (disambiguation)
Leopold III (disambiguation)
Leopold IV (disambiguation)